is a Japanese movie directed by Kei Kumai (1976)

The film, based on a novel of Kunio Tsuji, deals with the relationship between rich countries and the Third World. In the center of the story, Marie Therese (Claude Jade), a Swiss religious missionary,  meets the Japanese engineer Mitsuo (Go Kato) aboard a ship connecting Marseille to Yokohama. Theirs is a story of impossible love.

When French star Claude Jade arrived to play the role of the nun Marie Therese, she was accompanied for the second part of the shooting by her husband Bernard Coste. For journalists, it was agreed that officially he was the private secretary. Claude Jade says: I had to hide the existence of my husband and that I was pregnant ... My pregnancy also prevents me from returning to Japan for the first release of the movie! Production is estimated that this condition is incompatible with the role of a Nun, especially as the press believes me single.

The film has yet to see an NTSC release, nor even one with an English translation.

References

External links
Kita No Misaki in IMDb

1970s Japanese films